The Baby-Sitters Club is a 1995 American comedy-drama film directed by Melanie Mayron, in her feature film directorial debut. It is based on Ann M. Martin's novel series of the same name and is about one summer in the girls' lives in the fictional town of Stoneybrook, Connecticut. The film was shot in the California cities of Los Angeles, Altadena, and Santa Clarita.

The film was released on August 18, 1995. The film received mostly mixed to positive reviews, and grossed $9.6 million against a budget of $6.5 million.

Plot
Kristy Thomas, president of "The Baby-Sitters Club", decides to open a day camp for their clients. Her best friend, Mary Anne Spier, along with Mary Anne's stepsister Dawn Schafer, offer their parents' backyard to serve as the campsite. All of the club members (Kristy Thomas, Mary Anne Spier, Dawn Schafer, Claudia Kishi, Stacey McGill, Mallory Pike, and Jessi Ramsey) vow to keep a close eye on the kids.

Meanwhile, Kristy faces problems when she meets her estranged father (who abandoned her family seven years ago and started a new family in California), and faces a dilemma about telling her friends and family about this. Mary Anne is the only one she tells, and she too is under pressure as the curiosity of her friends grows.

Claudia is forced to attend summer school because she failed science. Kristy promises to help Claudia study but, because she is seeing her mother, their clients, perform a rap song for Claudia who has to take a test; if she fails the test, she would have to repeat the eighth grade and drop out of the club.

Stacey has a crush on a 17-year-old boy named Luca. As their relationship ensues, she faces problems telling him about her diabetes, and later, her age. This is revealed after a trip to a New York City club, in which a bouncer does not allow her into a club because she is underage. Luca is outraged, unable to believe that Stacey is 13 years old.

Meanwhile, Dawn must face her neighbor, Mrs. Haberman, who becomes increasingly upset because of the camp activities that are taking place next door.

Kristy's 13th birthday comes, and she has arranged to go to an amusement park with her father. Promising her friends she would make it to her own party, Kristy goes to meet her father, but he does not show up. She begins to walk home until her friends show up in Luca's car after Mary Anne tells them that Kristy's father came back.

Luca drives the girls back to Mallory's parents' cabin and present Kristy with a half-melted birthday cake. As Stacey is saying goodbye to Luca, he tells her that he will be coming to Stoneybrook again next year. Delighted, Stacey tells him that she will be 14 years old when he returns. They share a kiss just before Luca departs.

In return for making Mrs. Haberman's summer miserable, the girls give the greenhouse to her. Meanwhile, Kristy witnesses a miracle when Jackie Rodowsky hits his first home run, hitting Cokie Mason, who is sitting in a tree nearby, in the process.

Cast
 Schuyler Fisk as Kristy Thomas
 Rachael Leigh Cook as Mary Anne Spier
 Larisa Oleynik as Dawn Schafer
 Tricia Joe as Claudia Kishi
 Bre Blair as Stacey McGill
 Stacey Linn Ramsower as Mallory Pike
 Zelda Harris as Jessi Ramsey
 Vanessa Zima as Rosie Wilder
 Christian Oliver as Luca
 Brooke Adams as Elizabeth Thomas-Brewer
 Bruce Davison as Watson Brewer
 Jess Needham as Karen Brewer
 Ellen Burstyn as Mrs. Haberman
 Peter Horton as Patrick Thomas
 Asher Metchik as Jackie Rodowsky
 Austin O'Brien as Logan Bruno
 Marla Sokoloff as Cokie Mason
 Aaron Michael Metchik as Alan Gray
 Kyla Pratt as Becca Ramsey
 Scarlett Pomers as Suzi Barrett

Reception

Box office
The Baby-Sitters Club was one of two nationwide theatrical releases on the weekend of August 18, 1995. It suffered a disappointing debut, opening in ninth place with $3 million, which placed it behind Mortal Kombat. The total domestic gross was $9.6 million.

Critical response
On Rotten Tomatoes the film has an approval rating of 67% based on 15 reviews with an average rating of 6.20/10. On Metacritic it has a score of 48% based on reviews from 14 critics, indicating "mixed or average reviews". Audiences surveyed by CinemaScore gave the film a grade "B+" on scale of A to F.

Kevin Thomas of the Los Angeles Times gave the film 4.5 out of 5 calling it "A beautiful film that possesses the power to enchant all ages." Hal Hinson of The Washington Post called the film "A colorful, buoyant, loving tribute to the notion of girlfriends forever." Edward Guthmann of the San Francisco Chronicle gave the film 2 out of 4 and was critical of the film saying "85 minutes doesn't provide an adequate format for developing seven distinct characters."

Soundtrack

The Baby-Sitters Club: Music from the Motion Picture is a soundtrack that was released on August 8, 1995. The trailer memorably included such hit 90s songs as "Cornflake Girl" by Tori Amos, "Good" by Better Than Ezra, and "Dreams" by The Cranberries.

References

External links
 
 Trivia and review , from Merrill's Companion to The Baby-Sitters Club

1995 films
1995 comedy-drama films
1995 directorial debut films
1990s buddy comedy-drama films
1990s coming-of-age comedy-drama films
1990s female buddy films
1990s teen comedy-drama films
American buddy comedy-drama films
American coming-of-age comedy-drama films
American female buddy films
American teen comedy-drama films
The Baby-Sitters Club
Beacon Pictures films
Columbia Pictures films
Films based on American novels
Films based on children's books
Films directed by Melanie Mayron
Films scored by David Michael Frank
Films set in Connecticut
Films shot in Los Angeles
1990s English-language films
1990s American films